Kenneth Van Rooy (born October 8, 1993, in Turnhout) is a Belgian cyclist, who currently rides for UCI ProTeam .

Major results

2011
 1st Stage 3 Liège–La Gleize
2012
 5th Overall Carpathia Couriers Paths
1st Young rider classification
2013
 10th Grote 1-MeiPrijs
2014
 5th Memorial Van Coningsloo
 8th Grand Prix Criquielion
 10th Antwerpse Havenpijl
2015
 1st Tour de Liège
 4th Road race, UEC European Under-23 Road Championships
 4th Liège–Bastogne–Liège Espoirs
 6th Grand Prix Criquielion
 7th RideLondon–Surrey Classic
 9th Overall Tour de Bretagne
1st  Sprints classification
 10th Omloop Het Nieuwsblad U23
2018
 10th Grote Prijs Marcel Kint
 10th Veenendaal–Veenendaal Classic
2019
 2nd Internationale Wielertrofee Jong Maar Moedig
 5th Grand Prix Criquielion
 8th Overall Tour de Wallonie
2020
 2nd Overall Tour of Antalya
1st  Points classification
2021
 7th Grand Prix de Denain
 7th Eurométropole Tour
 10th Heistse Pijl
2022
 3rd Schaal Sels
 4th Primus Classic
 5th Druivenkoers Overijse
 9th Heistse Pijl

References

External links

1993 births
Living people
Belgian male cyclists
Sportspeople from Turnhout
Cyclists from Antwerp Province